Carbon Copy was an Australian  chestnut Thoroughbred horse, who raced from a two-year-old to a five year old recording 14 wins from 1 mile to 2 miles with regular jockey Scobie Breasley winning 8 races was a member of a vintage crop of three year olds 1948-1949 including Comic Court, Foxzami, Vagabond and Bernbrook.

Breeding

Carbon Copy was bred by the Silk Bros at their Glen Devon stud Werribee, Victoria by sire Helios (GB) from the mare Havers (AUS) by Windbag, Helios was a Leading sire in Australia and of the classic winner Beau Gem 1947 VRC Victoria Derby and a  great broodmare sire.

Racing career

Carbon Copy raced between 1948 -1951 and raced for four seasons a sensation in his 3 year old season winning major races in Sydney and Melbourne  raced in grand company against the champions Comic Court & Delta and after winning the 1949 AJC Plate at Randwick Racecourse defeating Melbourne Cup winner Russia by 10 lengths was to become the greatest stake winning 3 year old in Australian turf history with an offer of 95,000 pounds being refused by the owners.

 Carbon Copy's best son after retiring to stud where he was foaled at was the 1962 AJC Sydney Cup winner Grand Print. Des McCormick trainer was a former drover from Wangaratta was also a successful trainer of jumpers with notables being Winterset and Van Perri from his Mordialloc, Victoria stables. Des McCormick was inducted into the Australian Racing Hall of Fame in 2019.

Carbon Copy's racing record: 45 starts for 14 wins, 10 seconds, 6 thirds.

1948 & 1949 racebooks

1949 racebooks

Stud career

Undoubtedly Carbon Copy's best performer was Grand Print, winner of the 1962 Sydney Cup and 1964
Australian Cup.

References 

Cox Plate winners
Sydney Cup winners
Racehorses bred in Australia
Racehorses trained in Australia
1945 racehorse births